Alexandra Elizabeth Sahlen (born September 25, 1982) is a former American professional soccer player and entrepreneur. She played for the Western New York Flash of the National Women's Soccer League (NWSL) and was also the club's president.

Early life
Sahlen was born and raised in Williamsville, New York, a small suburb of Buffalo.

Niagara University
Sahlen attended Niagara University from 2000 to 2003 where she played for the Purple Eagles. She started 55 matches and completed her collegiate career with six goals and 10 assists, ranking 20th on the school's all-time scoring list. Sahlen helped guide the Purple Eagles to their first MAAC Championship appearance in 2003.

Playing career

Club

Rochester Ravens
Sahlen played with W-League club Rochester Ravens from 2005 until 2008, when a stress fracture in the first game of the season ruled her out of contention.

Western New York Flash
Along with husband Aaran Lines, Sahlen then founded a new professional W-League club, Buffalo Flash, in time for the 2009 season. Sahlen played for the Flash as they won the 2010 W-League championship and remained on the playing roster when the team changed its name to Western New York Flash and entered Women's Professional Soccer, claiming the 2011 WPS Championship.

Sahlen missed the 2014 NWSL season due to being pregnant and was not on the Flash roster for the 2015 season.

Coaching career
Sahlen was assistant coach for the women's soccer team at her alma mater, Niagara University from 2004 to 2011.

References

External links
 Western New York Flash player profile
 WPS player profile
 All White Kit: An Interview with WNY Flash Team President Alex Sahlen
 

1987 births
Living people
American women's soccer players
National Women's Soccer League players
Niagara Purple Eagles women's soccer players
People from Williamsville, New York
Soccer players from New York (state)
Sportspeople from Erie County, New York
Western New York Flash players
Women's association football defenders
Women's Professional Soccer players
21st-century American women